Playing with Souls is a 1925 American silent drama film directed by Ralph Ince and starring Jacqueline Logan, Mary Astor, and Clive Brook. The film is considered lost.

Plot
As described in a film magazine review, Matthew Hale and his irresponsible wife separate. Hale gives his wife control of their son until he is of age. She places him in a French school while she wanders about the continent, having a gay time. He is so lonely for her that he writes letters to himself. At twenty, forsaken of both parents, he leaves school and Margo, the young woman he loves, goes to Paris to find out about his father. The agent knows nothing and Matt decides to go to the dogs, falls a victim to Bricotte, a dancer in a cheap music hall. His father comes, unknown to Matt, wins Bricotte away from him. Out of funds, Matt forges his father’s name, and later jumping into the Seine. His father rescues him; they are reconciled and the young woman he loves comes to him.

Cast

References

Bibliography
 Goble, Alan. The Complete Index to Literary Sources in Film. Walter de Gruyter, 1999.

External links

1925 films
1925 drama films
Silent American drama films
Films directed by Ralph Ince
American silent feature films
1920s English-language films
First National Pictures films
American black-and-white films
1925 lost films
Lost drama films
Lost American films
1920s American films